Marilyn Jean Horan (born September 13, 1954) is a United States district judge of the United States District Court for the Western District of Pennsylvania.

Biography 

Horan received a Bachelor of Arts, magna cum laude, from the Pennsylvania State University in 1976 and her Juris Doctor from the University of Pittsburgh School of Law in 1979. From 1979 to 1996, Horan worked at the Butler, Pennsylvania law firm of Murrin, Taylor, Flach and Horan, where she was elevated to partner, in 1982. From 1996 to 2018, Horan served as a judge of the Court of Common Pleas for Butler County in the civil division. During her tenure on the state bench, she also presided over civil and family law cases.

Federal judicial service

Expired district court nomination under Obama 

On July 30, 2015, President Obama nominated Horan to serve as a United States District Judge of the United States District Court for the Western District of Pennsylvania, to the seat vacated by Judge Terrence F. McVerry, who assumed senior status on September 30, 2013. She received a hearing before the Senate Judiciary Committee on December 9, 2015. On January 28, 2016, her nomination was reported out of committee by voice vote. Her nomination expired on January 3, 2017, with the end of the 114th Congress.

Renomination to district court under Trump 

On December 20, 2017, her renomination by President Donald Trump was announced and sent to the United States Senate. Horan was nominated to the seat vacated by Gary L. Lancaster, who died on April 24, 2013. On February 15, 2018, the Senate Judiciary Committee voted to report her nomination by voice vote. On September 6, 2018, her nomination was confirmed by voice vote. She received her judicial commission on September 19, 2018.

Electoral history 

1997

2007

2017

References

External links 
 

1954 births
Living people
20th-century American lawyers
20th-century American judges
21st-century American lawyers
21st-century American judges
Judges of the Pennsylvania Courts of Common Pleas
Judges of the United States District Court for the Western District of Pennsylvania
Pennsylvania lawyers
Pennsylvania Republicans
Pennsylvania State University alumni
People from Butler, Pennsylvania
United States district court judges appointed by Donald Trump
University of Pittsburgh School of Law alumni
20th-century American women lawyers
21st-century American women lawyers
20th-century American women judges
21st-century American women judges